Darin Epsilon (born September 26, 1983) is a music producer, DJ, radio personality, record label owner, and music critic from Chicago, which is widely considered the birthplace of House music. He lived in Los Angeles from 2008 to 2016 and currently resides in Berlin as of 2017.

He is primarily known for electronic dance music, with releases on many of the industry's most respected labels including Perspectives Digital, Sudbeat, Global Underground, Renaissance, Hope Recordings, microCastle, Selador, and Perfecto Records.  His productions have entered Beatport's Top 100 charts numerous times and are featured in the compilations of Nick Warren, Hernan Cattaneo, Armin van Buuren, Markus Schulz, and Paul Oakenfold, among many others. He has collaborated with Hernan Cattaneo, Robert Babicz, Betoko, John Graham aka Quivver, Matt Lange, Matthew Dekay, Cid Inc, Omid 16B (S.O.S.), and Chris Fortier, among countless others.

In 2016 he was nominated for ‘Best Progressive House Artist’ in the annual Beatport Awards, and in 2011, John Digweed named him one of the winners in his 'Structures' DJ Mix Competition, sponsored by Bedrock and Ableton Live. The all-star panel of judges consisted of Oliver Lieb, Nick Muir, King Unique, Robert Babicz, and Digweed himself. Contestants were required to put together their best 25 to 30 minute mix using the tracks that appeared on the 'Structures Two' compilation. To make it even more special, 'Structures' DJ tools were included to weave into their sets.

As a DJ, he has shared the stage with many of dance music's superstars including Hernan Cattaneo, Nick Warren, John Digweed, Sasha, James Zabiela, Armin van Buuren B2B Markus Schulz, Above & Beyond, BT, and countless others. He has headlined over 7 major festivals by North America's biggest promoter, Insomniac Events, and been invited to perform at Amsterdam Dance Event, Ultra Music Festival, Burning Man, BPM Festival, and South By Southwest (SXSW). His frequent flyer miles are continually on the rise with regular tours around the world. He has electrified audiences across the United States, as well as headlined dozens of countries across 6 continents.

He currently hosts a monthly radio show and podcast called Perspectives. Established in November 2006, the show is split into two parts, with the first being his own 60 minute set, followed by a guest mix from an established artist. Perspectives has allowed him to feature dozens of respected names in the industry including Darren Emerson (formerly of Underworld (band)), Max Graham, Robert Babicz, Max Cooper, Guy J, Jody Wisternoff (one-half Way Out West with Nick Warren), and many more. The first broadcasts were on Digitally Imported (DI.fm), but the program has since moved to Frisky Radio. His record label Perspectives Digital was launched in November 2010 as an extension of the brand, further solidifying his influence and presence within the global dance community.

Global brands such as MTV, American DJ, American Audio, Elation Professional, and Global Truss have all called upon him to provide the soundtrack to their videos. His music can also be found in two films, placing him in a small category of producers that have ever made it onto the big screen.

Discography

Albums

Original productions

Remixes

Remixed

References

External links 
Official site

1983 births
Living people
Club DJs
American house musicians
American techno musicians
American DJs
American record producers
Progressive house musicians
Electronic dance music DJs
Monstercat Silk artists